Toys "R" Us (stylized as "ToysЯus") is an American toy, clothing, and baby product retailer owned by Tru Kids (doing business as Tru Kids Brands) and various others. The company was founded in 1957; its first store was built in April 1948, with its headquarters located in Parsippany-Troy Hills, New Jersey, in the New York metropolitan area.

While originally considered a category killer, the rise of mass merchants and online retailers cost Toys "R" Us its share of the toy market. The company was further hampered by a significant debt load, the result of a leveraged buyout organized by private equity firms. The company filed for bankruptcy in 2017 and 2018, closing all of its US, British, and Australian locations, with the last US stores closing in 2021. Operations in other international markets such as Asia and Africa were less affected, but chains in Canada, parts of Europe and Asia were eventually sold to third-parties.

In August 2021, WHP Global announced that Toys "R" Us would be opening over 400 stores within Macy's starting in 2022. The flagship store is located in New Jersey at the American Dream shopping and entertainment complex.

History

Origins
In April 1948, Charles P. Lazarus founded a baby-furniture retailer, Children's Bargaintown in Washington, D.C., during the post-war baby boom. It was acquired in 1966 by Interstate Department Stores, Inc.

The focus of the store changed in June 1957, and the first Toys "R" Us, dedicated exclusively to toys rather than furniture, was opened by Lazarus in Rockville, Maryland. Lazarus also designed and stylized the Toys "R" Us logo, which featured a backwards "R" ("Я") to give the impression that a child wrote it. The store chain grew successfully and built a brand which was recognized to many children born in the 1960s and 1970s, and shared in the success of the birth of popular culture successes of action figures (Star Wars, GI Joe), dolls (Cabbage Patch Kids, Rainbow Brite), video games (Nintendo's Super Mario series and other co-developed names, original SEGA Genesis stations and titles), and ultimately the co-branded FAO series, as the higher-end FAO Schwarz stores folded.

21st century
The board of directors installed John Eyler as CEO (formerly of FAO Schwarz) in May 2000. Eyler launched a plan to remodel and re-launch the chain. Blaming market pressures (primarily competition from Walmart and Target), Toys "R" Us considered splitting its toy and baby businesses. On March 17, 2005, a consortium of Bain Capital Partners LLC, Kohlberg Kravis Roberts (KKR) and Vornado Realty Trust announced a $6.6 billion leveraged buyout of the company. Public stock closed for the last time on July 21, 2005, at $26.75—a 63% increase since when it first announced that the company was put up for sale. Toys "R" Us became a privately owned entity after the buyout. The company still files with the Securities and Exchange Commission, as required by its debt agreements.

In December 2013, eight days before Christmas, Toys "R" Us announced their stores in the United States would stay open for 87 hours straight. The flagship store of the retailer in Times Square was open for 24 hours a day from December 1 to 24, to cater to tourists. The announcement came after snow and rain caused a nearly 9 percent year-over-year decline in U.S. store foot traffic. This move also pushed the retailer to hire an additional 45,000 seasonal workers to cater to the demand of the extended store hours. Since the toy business is highly seasonal, more than 40% of the company's sales come in during the fourth quarter of the year.

In 2014, Toys "R" Us announced its "TRU Transformation" strategy, which concentrated on efforts to fix foundational issues affecting future growth, including making stores less cluttered, improving the customer experience, clearer pricing strategies and promotions, and tighter integration of its retail and online businesses. In 2015, the company launched the first of a new concept store called the "Toy Lab" in Freehold, New Jersey. The new layout provided more space for interactive exhibits and areas to play with new toys before purchase. This concept has since been expanded to stores in California, Delaware, Florida, New York and Pennsylvania.

Bankruptcy

On September 18, 2017, Toys "R" Us, Inc. filed for Chapter 11 bankruptcy, stating the move would give it flexibility to deal with $5 billion in long-term debt by borrowing $2 billion so it could pay suppliers for the upcoming holiday season and invest in improving current operations. The company has not had an annual profit since 2013. It reported a net loss of US$164 million in the quarter ending April 29, 2017. It lost US$126 million in the same period in the prior year. It had been paying US$400 million per year to service its debt, which prevented it from investing in improvements to in-store experiences to compete with Amazon and Walmart. Although the "retail apocalypse" was a factor, some analysts cited that the rapid increase in debt occurred under its private equity ownership.

It was initially stated that only the U.S. and Canadian operations would be affected, and that its brick-and-mortar stores and online sales sites would continue to operate. In January 2018, the company announced it would liquidate and close up to 182 of its stores in the U.S. as part of its restructuring, as well as convert up to 12 stores into co-branded Toys "R" Us and Babies "R" Us stores.

On February 28, 2018, it was reported that the company was exploring retaining its stronger Canadian operations, and the divestiture of some of its corporate-owned stores to franchises (leaving approximately 200 in a downsized chain). Toys "R" Us Inc. later announced that all U.S. locations would be closed.

On March 15, 2018, Toys "R" Us received approval from the bankruptcy court to liquidate its stores. There were buyers interested in acquiring groups of stores to use as showrooms, as well as others interested in acquiring the chain's brand and associated intellectual property. The company indicated in filings that the Canadian operations were profitable, and desired to preserve the operations of the 82-store chain through a sale. MGA Entertainment had made an offer to acquire the Canadian operations. MGA Entertainment CEO Isaac Larian attempted to raise $200 million through investments and public crowdfunding to purchase at least 400 of the U.S. locations.

Liquidation sales began on March 23, 2018. The chain's online store shut down on March 29, redirecting visitors to information on the liquidation and closures. On April 24, 2018, it was announced that the Canadian division would be sold to Fairfax Financial for approximately $234 million, and would continue to operate the locations under the Toys "R" Us name. Fairfax stated that it was potentially interested in purchasing U.S. locations as an extension of these Canadian operations.

On April 13, a bid was made by Isaac Larian to buy 356 Toys "R" Us stores for $890 million, but was rejected on April 17 and was fully scrapped on April 23.

On June 29, 2018, Toys "R" Us permanently closed all of its remaining U.S. locations, after 70 years of operations. In early July 2018, it was reported that unknown benefactors had bought out all of the remaining stock of two locations in North Carolina so they could be donated to charity.

In November 2018, Fortune noted that the absence of the retailer during the 2018 holiday season represented a  chunk of toy sales from which other retailers could benefit. Party supply retailer Party City capitalized on the closures by establishing temporary pop-up stores under the branding Toy City—some of which filling vacancies left by Toys "R" Us locations.

Restructuring, Tru Kids, Inc., WHP Global, and second restructuring
On October 1, 2018, the company issued a bankruptcy court filing which stated that it would no longer auction off its intellectual property, since its controlling lender planned to "[revive] the business behind the Toys 'R' Us and Babies 'R' Us brand names" with a focus on maintaining existing licensing agreements and establishing new retail opportunities. The company evaluated that selling its brand at auction "[was] not reasonably likely to yield a superior alternative."

At the Toy Industry Association's Fall Toy Preview, the company unveiled plans for a preliminary venture to be known as Geoffrey's Toy Box, a wholesale store-within-a-store concept that the company planned to deploy in time for the holiday shopping season. The company planned to revive the Toys "R" Us and Babies "R" Us brands in the future. In November 2018, it was announced that grocery market chain Kroger would add toy displays under the Geoffrey's Toy Box brand to some of its locations, to sell selections of Toys "R" Us private-label products. The brand operates under Geoffrey LLC, an intellectual property holding company within Toys "R" Us.

On January 20, 2019, the company emerged from bankruptcy as Tru Kids.

As of June 21, 2019, the company planned to open new stores in the US slated to be 10,000 square feet, roughly a third of the size of the big box brand that closed in 2018. On November 27, 2019, Toys "R" Us opened a retail store at Westfield Garden State Plaza in Paramus, New Jersey. On December 7, 2019, a second location was opened at The Galleria in Houston, Texas.

On October 8, 2019, the company relaunched the Toys "R" Us website, which would feature a focus on resources and videos highlighting popular toys. The site was established in partnership with Target, with users being redirected to Target.com to place their orders. In 2020, the agreement lapsed, and Amazon replaced Target as the site's fulfillment partner.

In 2021, as a result of financial losses caused by the COVID-19 pandemic, the only two U.S. stores once again closed down. The Houston location closed on January 15, 2021, and the Paramus location closed on January 26, 2021. The company stated that they made a strategic decision to pivot their store strategy, so they can look for new stores and platforms that will offer better traffic and that they continue to invest in channels where customers will want to experience their brand.

On March 15, 2021, it was announced that brand management company WHP Global acquired a controlling interest in Tru Kids, which is the parent company of the Toys R Us, Babies R Us and Geoffrey the Giraffe brands. Going forward WHP will be managing Tru Kids business, and help guiding its expansion. In North America WHP plans to open Toys R Us stores, again — ideally ahead of the holiday season and could come on various formats to include flagships, pop-ups, airport locations or mini stores inside other retailers' shops. WHP has not yet set a number of locations it plans to open in the United States. WHP is backed by a $350 million equity commitment from funds that are managed by Oaktree Capital Management. Financial terms of the deal have yet to be disclosed.

On August 19, 2021, WHP announced a new shift in branding by partnering with Macy's to sell toys on the retailer's website and open store-within-a-store locations at 400 department store locations.

On December 16, 2021, Toys "R" Us opened a two-story flagship store in the American Dream mall in New Jersey.

On August 7, 2022, Toys "R" Us opened new locations in nine states: California, Georgia, New Jersey, Illinois, Nevada, Louisiana, New York, Maryland and Missouri. These stores are located inside Macy's stores and range from 1,000 to 10,000 square feet. The company plans to open a store in every Macy's location in the United States by October 15, 2022, just in time for the holiday season.

Flagship store

In July 2001, Toys "R" Us opened an international flagship store in New York's Times Square at a cost of $35 million. The 110,000 square-foot store included various themed zones such as Barbie (with a life-size dreamhouse), Jurassic Park (with an animatronic T-Rex), Lego, and the signature indoor Ferris wheel. The flagship store also served as a gaming destination, partnering with Microsoft to be the world's first location to launch the original Xbox console on November 15, 2001. In 2006, the store added a Dance Dance Revolution SuperNova arcade machine in its electronics department. The store later added a full amusement arcade, known as "R"Cade. In 2010, a Wonka shop opened on the second floor of the flagship store. The store drew thousands of tourists for over a decade before the company decided to cancel its lease on the space in December 2015.

In August 2017, Toys "R" Us announced a 35,000 square-foot temporary store near the original one that would be open around the Christmas shopping season.

Charitable giving
From 2004 until its demise in 2018, Toys "R" Us Inc., the former owner of Toys "R" Us, had partnered with the Toys for Tots foundation to serve as a donation site for anyone donating unwrapped toys or monetary gifts. However, there is no evidence that the current parent, Tru Kids Inc., has continued Toys "R" Us's relationship with Toys for Tots and the Toys for Tots Foundation has not included any recent information on their website concerning Toys "R" Us since the Toys "R" Us Inc. bankruptcy filing in 2018.

Product safety
Toys "R" Us had reportedly implemented high safety standards in 2007 and had vowed to take an aggressive approach towards holding vendors accountable for meeting those standards. Former chairman and CEO Gerald L. Storch, testifying before the Senate Appropriations Subcommittee on Financial Services and General Government on toy safety in September 2007, said he supported new legislation strengthening toy-safety standards and outlined new initiatives the retailer had set forth to ensure that its customers receive timely information on recalls (including a new website).

In 2008, the company introduced stricter product safety standards exceeding federal requirements. Among the new standards was a requirement for materials inside toys to meet a standard of 250 parts per million of lead for all products manufactured exclusively for the retailer (compared with the federal standard of 600 ppm.) Toys "R" Us also announced the requirement that baby products be produced without the addition of phthalates, which have raised concerns about infant safety. The company had adjusted its requirements to meet new federal standards enacted with the Consumer Product Safety Improvement Act of 2008.

International operations
During its most recent entry into a new market in November 2011 when it opened its first licensed store in Poland (Blue City), Toys "R" Us, International operated more than 600 international stores and over 140 licensed stores in 35 countries and jurisdictions outside the United States. At its peak, Toys "R" Us, International had presence in 40 countries.

Many of these stores were corporate-owned, but stores in some countries were independently owned and operated with Toys "R" Us licensing its name to a local company.

Canada

In addition to its expansion in the United States, Toys "R" Us launched a worldwide presence in September 1984 when the company opened its first international wholly-owned store in Canada.

As of its sale to Fairfax Financial on June 1, 2018, the chain comprises 82 stores that continue to operate under the Toys "R" Us name following the sale. In 2021, Doug Putman, through his company Putman Investments, announced that he would buy Toys "R" Us Canada from Fairfax Financial.

Australia

The Australian wing of Toys "R" Us entered voluntary administration on May 22, 2018. On June 20, it was announced that all of their Australian stores would be closing as well. The closure of all 44 stores was concluded on August 5, 2018.

On June 5, 2019, Toys "R" Us returned in Australia when Tru Kids partnered with Hobby Warehouse to relaunch the website for the chain.

Africa and the Middle East
Since 1995 the Al-Futtaim Group has operated stores in Bahrain, Egypt, Kuwait, Oman, Qatar, and the United Arab Emirates. Stores in Israel are operated by the Fishman retail group, while stores in Saudi Arabia are owned by Tasweeq Company. Stores in South Africa, Namibia, and Zambia are also independently owned and operated.

Asia

Toys "R" Us has extensive presence in East Asian territories and Southeast Asia under the umbrella of Toys "R" Us Asia, a loose amalgamation of joint ventures with local companies. Toys "R" Us stores operate in Brunei, China (mainland, Hong Kong, and Macau), India, Japan, South Korea, Malaysia, the Philippines, Singapore, Taiwan, and Thailand.

The Asian unit was originally established in 1985 as a partnership between Toys "R" Us and Fung Retailing, the retail subsidiary of the Fung Group (a Hong Kong-based conglomerate that also owns Li & Fung, a major retail distributor), with the parent company owning a majority 85% stake while Fung Retailing owns the remainder of the shares. Following Toys "R" Us' sale of the Asian unit in November 2018, Fung Retailing becomes the lead shareholder of the unit, holding an increased share of 21% while Toys "R" Us' remaining 79% is distributed among a consortium of Toys "R" Us' lenders.

The joint venture was supposed to last until 2018, but Toys "R" Us withdrew in 2006; after suing for breach of contract, McDonald's Holdings was awarded an ¥1.38 billion ($13.35 million) settlement in 2008. After their joint venture ended, Toys "R" Us increased their ownership from approximately 48% to about 61%, and integrated it into their overall Asian operation in 2017.

Locations in South Korea and India are established through joint ventures formed in conjunction with Lotte Mart in 2007 and Lulu Hypermarket in 2017, respectively.

Buoyed by increasing demand for toys in the Asia Pacific region, the Asian and Japanese arms of Toys "R" Us are among the Toys "R" Us subsidiaries that have remained profitable into the 2000s and 2010s, registering "double-digit" revenue growth through the mid-to-late 2010s. In 2015, Toys "R" Us Asia posted a total turnover of US$1.85 billion; for the year ended January 2017, net sales from China and Southeast Asia totaled at approximately US$375 million while the Japanese arm would net sales of US$1.3 billion from Toys "R" Us, despite recently declining yearly profits, and US$20.3 million from Babies "R" Us.

While representatives of the Asian arm of Toys "R" Us have consistently cited that they operate as a separate legal entity from the parent company and are unaffected by events at the parent company, Toys "R" Us had engaged in talks since February 2018 to offload Toys "R" Us Asia's majority stake to a bidder for a proposed US$1 billion while outlets in Asia continue to operate unaffected. The planned bid was revised downwards to US$760 million in August and scheduled for September while Toys "R" Us sought a United States court order to strip Fung Retailing, a Hong Kong-based partner managing the majority of Toys "R" Us Asian operations, of its right-of-first-refusal purchase option and force Fung Retailing to release its share of the unit. This follows allegations by Toys "R" Us of Fung Retailing delaying the sale via court proceedings filed through the Hong Kong judiciary system to discourage rival bidders and acquire Toys "R" Us share at a lower price; the Eastern District of Virginia bankruptcy court would subsequently issue an order for Fung Retailing to drop its court order for the delay in a September 28, 2018, report.

On November 16, 2018, Toys "R" Us Asia announced that the parent company has formally sold the Asian unit to Fung Retailing and multiple Toys "R" Us lenders at a valuation of US$900 million (later revised to US$760 million), with Fung Retailing receiving an increase in shares of the unit to become the lead shareholder of Toys "R" Us Asia and the unit securing the licensing rights to retain the Toys "R" Us namebrand.

Turkey
Toys "R" Us entered Turkey in 1996 by licensing its brand to Turkish firm Uluslararası Çocuk Çarşıları A.S. In 2008, the firm terminated Toys "R" Us' licensing agreement and rebranded the 35 stores as Toyiki. However, under the new brand, the company struggled and had entered bankruptcy various times. In July 2010, Toyiki shut down their 32 remaining stores in exchange for debts.

Europe

Poland
Toys "R" Us entered the Polish market in October 2011, with their first store opening in Blue City, Warsaw. In October 2014, they began online operations.

The Polish operations remained unaffected during the bankruptcy, and by 2017 16 stores were operating. Eventually, the Polish chain began to close stores to cover the cost of debts and losses affected from the COVID-19 pandemic, closing seven of them in 2021. In February 2022, the store's website was shuttered and the remaining stores were closed throughout the year, and currently, only the Łódź store remains in operation.

United Kingdom
The first European Toys "R" Us stores were located in the United Kingdom, with the first store opening in 1985. At its peak, the chain had over 105 stores in the country. They were operated by Toys "R" Us Limited.

On December 4, 2017, the company reported that it would be liquidating and closing at least 26 stores in the United Kingdom as part of an insolvency restructuring known as a company voluntary arrangement. After amassing £15 million in unpaid taxes, Toys "R" Us Limited entered administration on February 28, 2018, after failing to find a buyer. On March 2, 2018, it was announced that all UK stores would begin a liquidation sale, and on March 14, 2018, it was announced that all UK stores were expected to close within six weeks. On April 24, 2018, Toys "R" Us stopped trading in the United Kingdom after 33 years of service. All stores were closed by April 24, 2018.

On 28 October 2021, Toys "R" Us announced plans to reopen its UK arm, initially through online purchasing from its Australian arm, then with physical branches opening from 2022 onwards. The online store reopened the following year, and this was followed up with a deal with WH Smith to open up Toys "R" Us branded concessions inside nine WH Smith stores.

DACH countries
Stores in Germany, Austria and Switzerland were operated by Toys "R" Us AG.

In April 2018, it was announced that Smyths would acquire Toys "R" Us AG, although they were still pending by July. The deal was completed in January 2019, and all stores were rebranded as Smyths shortly afterward.

France
In July 2018, Toys "R" Us France went into receivership in order to look for a buyer. The franchise including 44 of the stores was purchased by French company Jellej Jouets in October 2018. In April 2019, they sold the stores over to Luderix International, the owners of rival chain PicWic. The merger was soon completed, and by July 2019 all Toys "R" Us and PicWic stores were rebranded as PicWicToys.

Due to profit losses caused by the COVID-19 pandemic, the chain closed several of their stores in 2020, and soon went into receivership in May 2022. In July 2022, Smyths, who already owned the ex-Toys "R" Us stores in German-speaking areas, purchased PicWicToys. The stores will rebrand under the Smyths name beginning in January 2023.

Iberia
In August 2018, Toys "R" Us Iberia, consisting of stores in Spain and Portugal, was sold to Green Swan. In April 2022, Toys "R" Us Iberia filed for bankruptcy. In July 2022, Italian business PRG Retail Group purchased Toys "R" Us Iberia under a long-term agreement with the brand owners WHP Global, and continue operating the stores and website under the brand.

Scandinavia
In Denmark, Finland, Iceland, Norway, and Sweden, Toys "R" Us stores were independently operated by Top-Toy under license. Because of this, these respective stores were not affected by the bankruptcy of Toys "R" Us' parent company. However, Top Toy would file for bankruptcy itself on December 30, 2018, due to poor holiday sales. with all Toys "R" Us stores closing by January 10, 2019.

Netherlands
In the Netherlands, 17 stores were operated under the brand by third-party licensee Speelhoorn. In March 2009, the contract between the two companies was not renewed, with Speelhoorn re-branding all the stores as Toys XL. which would be later purchased by rival business Intertoys in 2017. They originally attempted to sell the stores in 1997 to Blokker but were denied permission due to competition costs.

Stores
Until their liquidation and closing in 2018, the company owned 739 stores in the United States, in addition to more than 750 international stores and more than 245 licensed stores in 37 countries and jurisdictions.

Other brands

Imaginarium
Imaginarium was a private label brand of Toys "R" Us for most of their toys that was acquired in 1999. Originally after the acquisition by Toys "R" Us in 1999, it also operated stores until 2004.

Kids "R" Us

Kids "R" Us was a children's discount clothing retailer. Their first stores opened in February 1983 in Paramus, New Jersey, and Brooklyn, New York. The chain folded in January 2004 after the retailer suffered deteriorating same-store sales and to focus more on the Toys "R" Us brand.

Babies "R" Us

The first Babies "R" Us store opened in April 1996 in Westbury, New York. In February 1997, Toys "R" Us acquired Duncan-based Baby Superstore, Inc., a 78-store chain, for $376 million. The locations were converted into Babies "R" Us. The store operates as a specialty baby products retailer and grew to about 260 stores in the United States. The stores offer an assortment of products for newborns, infants, and toddlers. The company also maintains a registry and offers pre- and post-natal classes and events.

In 2011, Toys "R" Us began to open co-branded locations with Babies "R" Us departments at 21 new locations, and 23 remodeled locations.

In 2023, it was announced that Babies "R" Us would be returning with a new flagship location inside the American Dream Mall (which also houses the flagship Toys "R" Us store).

FAO Schwarz
In May 2006, Toys "R" Us, Inc., acquired toy retailer FAO Schwarz including the retailer's flagship store on Fifth Avenue in New York City, as well as its e-commerce site, FAO.com. The company closed the FAO Schwarz flagship store in New York on July 15, 2015, citing rising rental costs, but continued to carry FAO Schwarz-branded toys in its Toys "R" Us and Babies "R" Us stores until 2017.

Toys "R" Us Express
For the 2009 holiday-shopping season, Toys "R" Us tried a smaller-store concept to attract customers and 90 "Holiday Express" stores across the United States and Canada were opened. The Holiday Express stores are smaller than regular Toys "R" Us stores, often in malls, and offer a more limited selection of merchandise than would be available at a stand-alone Toys "R" Us store. Most (if not all) of these 90 stores were opened in shopping-center and mall spaces that had been vacated by store chains closing their doors during the recession (including KB Toys, several of which were taken over by Toys "R" Us). Toys "R" Us's plan was to keep the Holiday Express stores open until early January 2010 and close them shortly thereafter, but the success of so many prompted the company to reconsider and several were kept open. These stores are known as "Toys "R" Us Express". Beginning in May 2010, Toys "R" Us opened a total of 600 Express stores. Four more were converted to Toys "R" Us outlet stores. As with the larger, basic Toys "R" Us stores, these locations also closed along with the outlet stores in the United States during summer 2018.

Web operations

Toys "R" Us began selling toys online with the launch of Toysrus.com in 1998. Following a disastrous Christmas 1999 trading period during which the company failed to deliver gifts on time, Toys "R" Us entered into a ten-year contract with online retailer Amazon in 2000 to be the exclusive supplier of toys on the website. Amazon eventually reneged on the terms of the contract by allowing third-party retailers to use its marketplace to sell toys, citing Toys "R" Us's failure to carry a sufficiently large range of goods, including the most popular lines. In 2006, Toys "R" Us successfully sued Amazon; the company was awarded $51 million in damages in 2009, just over half of the $93 million initially claimed.

It placed at No. 29 in the Internet Retailer Top 500 Guide for 2012. Toysrus.com was one of the most visited sites in the specialty toy and baby products retail category with an assortment of toys. In addition, Babiesrus.com offered a wide selection of baby products and supplies and access to the company's baby registry.

Looking to expand its web portfolio, in February 2009, the company acquired online toy seller eToys.com from Parent Co., which filed for bankruptcy protection in December 2008. Financial terms were not disclosed. Around the same time, it was reported that Toys "R" Us, Inc. bought Toys.com for an estimated $5.1 million. Today, the company operates Toys.com to list unadvertised and exclusive deals available on its portfolio of e-commerce sites.

In 2010, Toys "R" Us, Inc. reported that its Internet sales grew 29.9% year-over-year to $782 million from $602 million, and in April 2011, the company announced plans to open a dedicated e-commerce fulfillment center in McCarran, Nevada. The company later reported online sales of $1 billion for 2011 and $1.1 billion for 2012.

Under Tru Kids, the Toys "R" Us website was revived in 2019 in partnership with Target, with online orders being redirected to Target.com for fulfillment. In 2020, the site switched to Amazon as its fulfillment partner. This lasted until 2021, when fulfillment was handed over to Macys.com as part of their deal with Toys "R" Us.

Mascot

Formerly known as "Dr. G. Raffe" in 1950s print advertisements for Children's Bargaintown, Geoffrey the Giraffe evolved in name and appearance over the next decade to become the official mascot of the renamed Toys "R" Us. He also made his first TV commercial appearance on television in 1973. Serving as a "spokesanimal" for the brand, Geoffrey's design went through several phases over the next 50+ years before the current star-spotted iteration was finalized in November 2007.

In 2017, the company sponsored the live camera broadcast for April the Giraffe, which helped support giraffe conservation and awareness. The sponsored camera of pregnant April the giraffe went viral with millions of views on YouTube and across social media platforms.

See also
Gamleys
Toys "R" Us, Inc. v. Step Two, S.A
Retail apocalypse

Notes

References

Further reading
Jamie Morgan & Muhammad Ali Nasir (2020) "Financialised Private Equity Finance and the Debt Gamble: The Case of Toys R Us." New Political Economy.
"Charles P. Lazarus: The Titan of Toys "R" Us" by Anne Koopman, 1991

External links

 
 Corporate website

 
Companies based in Passaic County, New Jersey
Companies that filed for Chapter 11 bankruptcy in 2017
Companies that have entered administration in the United Kingdom
American companies established in 1948
Retail companies established in 1948
Retail companies disestablished in 2018
Retail companies established in 2019
Toy retailers of the United States
Li & Fung
Private equity portfolio companies
Babycare
Kohlberg Kravis Roberts companies
Bain Capital companies
Wayne, New Jersey
2005 mergers and acquisitions
2009 disestablishments in the Netherlands
2018 disestablishments in the United Kingdom
2018 disestablishments in New Jersey
Australian companies disestablished in 2018
1948 establishments in Washington, D.C.
1984 establishments in England
1983 establishments in the Netherlands
2019 establishments in New Jersey
Defunct retail companies of the Netherlands
Defunct retail companies of the United Kingdom
Toy retailers of Australia
2019 disestablishments in France
Re-established companies
Australian companies established in 1993
French companies established in 1983
Dutch companies established in 1983
British companies established in 1984
American companies established in 2019